Sæter is a light rail tram stop on the Oslo Tramway.

Located at Nordstrand, it was the terminus of the Ekeberg Line when it was opened in 1917 by AS Ekebergbanen in cooperation with Kristiania Sporveisselskab. In 1941 the Ekeberg Line was extended to Ljabru, the current terminus. Until 1967, the stretch between Sæter and Ljabru was the only single track rail in Oslo.

Sæter is a key word in John Buchan's novel "The Three Hostages".

References

Oslo Tramway stations in Oslo
Railway stations opened in 1917
1917 establishments in Norway